Philip Foglio (born May 1, 1956) is an American cartoonist and comic book artist known for his humorous science fiction and fantasy art.

Early life and career
Foglio was born on May 1, 1956, in Mount Vernon, New York, and moved with his family to Hartsdale, New York, where he lived until he was 17. He attended the Chicago Academy of Fine Arts in Chicago, Illinois, and was a member of the university's science fiction club, art-directing & co-editing the group's fanzine, Effen Essef. He was nominated for both the Hugo Award for Best Fan Artist and the Hugo Award for Best Dramatic Presentation in 1976, and won Best Fan Artist in 1977 and 1978. After living in the DePaul dorms for a few years, Phil moved to the Rogers Park neighborhood of Chicago and hosted weekly Thursday Night Meetings of Chicago-area science fiction fans. He drew the first known Unix daemons for a limited series of T-shirts in 1979.

Beginning in 1980, Foglio wrote and illustrated the comic strip What's New with Phil & Dixie for Dragon Magazine from TSR Games, satirizing the world of role-playing games. The strip ran monthly for three years. In the early 1980s, after some time in Chicago attempting to find work doing science fiction magazine and book illustration, Foglio moved to New York City. He formed the independent comic-book company "" [no capitals] with science-fiction writer-artist Connor Freff Cochran (Freff) and SF book editor Melissa Ann Singer. Working with editorial input from Chris Claremont, Foglio and Freff wrote and drew a single issue of a science-fiction/historical title called D'Arc Tangent before ending their collaboration in 1984.

He eventually returned to the Rogers Park neighborhood of Chicago and continued fantasy and science-fiction art. For publisher Donning/Starblaze, Foglio illustrated the MythAdventures series of fantasy novels by Robert Lynn Asprin, and he later adapted the first book, Another Fine Myth, into an eight-issue comic-book series from WaRP Graphics. The WaRP work eventually led to comic-book assignments from DC Comics (Angel and the Ape, Plastic Man and Stanley and His Monster miniseries), Marvel Comics, and First Comics (back up stories in issues of Grimjack and scripting over Doug Rice's plots in Dynamo Joe). He also joined the Moebius theatre group, and he held regular meetings and poker parties for the local science fiction community.

Foglio initiated his long-running character Buck Godot for the publication Just Imagine, published by Denny Meisinger. Basing the humorous science-fiction detective on a real-life friend, John Buckley, Foglio "did a couple of those in the black-and-whites and then Donning said they wanted Buck Godot graphic novels", two of which followed.

Later work

In the 1990s, Foglio met and married his wife, Kaja. The two contributed art to the collectible card game Magic: The Gathering, from Wizards of the Coast and resurrected the comic strip What's New with Phil & Dixie for that company's Duelist magazine. During this decade, Foglio co-founded Palliard Press and published additional comics, including a new Buck Godot series and the whimsical erotic series XXXenophile. The Foglios later founded Studio Foglio and began to produce the steampunk-fantasy series Girl Genius.

In April 2005, the Foglios abandoned publishing periodical-style comic books and began publishing Girl Genius online as a free webcomic, updated three times a week. Foglio told an interviewer that as of November 2005, "[W]e've quadrupled our number of readers, and tripled our sales" of traditional comics and related merchandise.

Awards
In 1976, the slide show The Capture, which Robert Asprin wrote and Foglio illustrated, was nominated for the Hugo Award for Best Dramatic Presentation; in the same year, he was nominated for the Hugo Award for Best Fan Artist for the first time. Foglio won the Fan Artist Hugo twice, in 1977 and 1978. He was nominated for the Hugo Award for Best Professional Artist in 2008. He, his wife (Kaja Foglio), and their colorist (Cheyenne Wright) won the first graphic story Hugo for Girl Genius, Volume 8: Agatha Heterodyne and the Chapel of Bones in 2009. The three again won the award for subsequent volumes in 2010 and 2011. Having won the Hugo Award for Best Graphic Story in all three of its first three years, Kaja, Phil, and Cheyenne announced that, in order to show that the category was a "viable award" (with quality competitors besides themselves), they were refusing nomination for the following year (2012). Girl Genius was once again nominated for a Hugo in 2014, but did not win.

In 1993, he was awarded the Inkpot Award.

Selected works
 What's New with Phil & Dixie (comic strip) in Dragon Magazine #49–84 (1980s) and Duelist (1990s), collected in three comic book volumes now available online
 What's New with Phil & Dixie (comic strip) in Dragon #266–311 & 359 (2000s)
 MythAdventures series of novels by Robert Lynn Asprin (illustrations) (Donning/Starblaze editions only):
 Another Fine Myth 
 Myth Conceptions 
 Myth Directions 
 Hit or Myth 
 Myth-ing Persons 
 Little Myth Marker 
 M.Y.T.H. Inc. Link 
 Myth-nomers and Im-perv-ections 
 M.Y.T.H. Inc. in Action 
 Sweet Myth-tery of Life 
 Myth-taken Identity 
 Class Dis-Mythed 
 Myth-Gotten Gains 
 MythAdventures Omnibus editions
 Robert Asprin's Myth Adventures Volume 1 
 Robert Asprin's Myth Adventures Volume 2 
 MythFortunes: the MythAdventures board game
  comic book:
 D'Arc Tangent #1 of a planned 16-issue series (no other issues were ever released). Collaboration with Freff, Lucie Chin, and Melissa Ann Singer
 WaRP Graphics comic books:
 MythAdventures! #1–8 (1980s) (after #8 Foglio left and the series was continued with other artists)
 Reprinted as two graphic novels, in color and with additional art
 First Comics comic books:
 Grimjack #15, 23, 40 (Munden's Bar features)
 Dynamo Joe #4–15, Special (script)
 DC Comics comic books:
 Angel and the Ape #1–4 (Feb.–May 1993), miniseries
 Plastic Man miniseries (script)
 Stanley and His Monster miniseries
 Buck Godot comic books:
 Buck Godot: Zap Gun for Hire graphic novel
 Buck Godot: Psmith graphic novel
 Buck Godot: The Gallimaufry series #1–8
 Over 50 cards from the collectible card game Magic: The Gathering
 Metal miniatures and covers to the board game Robo Rally
 XXXenophile comic books #1–10, collected volumes 1–6
 Girl Genius comic book series #1– (ongoing)
 Agatha H Girl Genius novels:
 Agatha H and the Airship City ©2011,  Night Shade Books
 Agatha H and the Clockwork Princess ©2012,  Night Shade Books
 Agatha H and the Voice of the Castle ©2014,  Night Shade Books
 Agatha H. and the Siege of Mechanicsburg ©2020,  Night Shade Books
 Illustrations for several games by Spiderweb Software (Nethergate, Avernum 1–3)
 Novel Illegal Aliens with Nick Pollotta
 That Darn Squid God!, fantasy/humor novel, as James Clay with Nick Pollotta
 Cover of Bureau 13: Stalking the Night Fantastic by Tri Tac Games
 Co-author of Dealer's Choice: The Complete Handbook of Saturday Night Poker, with James Ernest and Mike Selinker
 Illustrated GURPS Illuminati University (aka GURPS IOU) with Kaja Foglio. The dark to humorous Illuminati University setting for Steve Jackson Games GURPS Role Playing Game system.
 Illustrated cards for Space Pirate Amazon Ninja Catgirls, Fade Manley's game published by Steve Jackson Games
 Illustrated CD album cover for Beatnik Turtle's The Cheapass Album for James Ernest's Cheapass Games
 Illustrated several cards in various publications of the Munchkin series of card games

References

External links

 
 The Phil Foglio Gallimaufry (fan-site checklist)
 Independent Propaganda: "INTERVIEW: From Print To The Web with Phil Foglio of GIRL GENIUS Web Comic" (June 18, 2006)
 An illustrated list of Magic the Gathering cards by Phil Foglio
 
 

1956 births
American webcomic creators
Comic book publishers (people)
American comic strip cartoonists
DePaul University alumni
Game artists
Hugo Award-winning artists
Living people
Artists from Chicago
Writers from Mount Vernon, New York
Artists from Seattle
School of the Art Institute of Chicago alumni
 
Steampunk writers
People from Hartsdale, New York
Inkpot Award winners